Dubová may refer to:

 Dubová, Pezinok District in the Pezinok District, Slovakia
 Dubová, Svidník District in the Svidník District, Slovakia